Thorsten Owusu Gyimah (born 8 May 2003), popularly known as Yaw Tog, is a Ghanaian rapper who majors in drill music, known in Ghana as Asakaa. He is best known for his viral song "Sore" which featured O'Kenneth, City Boy, Reggies & Jay Bahd and also Kwesi Arthur and Stormzy on the remix produced by Chris Rich.

Education 
Gyimah was a student of Opoku Ware Senior High School. He wrote his final WASSCE paper on 7 October 2021.

PERSONAL LIFE 
Yaw Tog lived all his life in Santasi in Kumasi before fame found him through music

Discography

EPs 
 Time

Singles 
 Sophia 
 Sore feat. O`Kenneth,City Boy, Reggie & Jay Bahd
 Sore Remix feat. Kwesi Arthur & Stormzy
 Y33gye
 Africa
 Empty 
 Daben 
Mood
Time
Fake Ex
Boyz
Gold Friends
Sei Mu
Azul with Bad Boy Timz

Concerts
He performed at the 17th Ghana Party in the Park UK Concert with his manager Joe Avneri.

Awards and nominations

References

External links 
Official Instagram Profile

Ghanaian rappers
Living people
People from Kumasi
2003 births
Alumni of Opoku Ware School